Norbert Bisky (born 1970) is a German artist based in Berlin. He is one of the most important representatives of a new figurative painting in the 21st century.

Life 

Norbert Bisky was born in Leipzig and grew up in the former German Democratic Republic as "part of a very Communist family that really believed in all that stuff".

From 1994 to 1999 Norbert Bisky studied painting at Hochschule der Künste in Berlin where he was a Master Student of Georg Baselitz and at the Salzburg Summer Academy in the class of Jim Dine.

In 1995, he spent a year as an exchange student in Madrid, where he discovered the works of Francisco de Goya, Francisco de Zubaráns and Jusepe de Ribera.

Bisky was a guest professor at the HEAD Academy of arts in Geneva from 2008 to 2010 and from 2016 to 2018 at HBK Braunschweig. In 2015, he swapped studios with Tel Aviv based artist Erez Israeli for three months.

Work 

Norbert Biskys early paintings are most commonly described as heavily influenced by socialist realism, the official art of the GDR. Comparing the belief in communism to a religion, he processed his childhood memories by painting "those images of paradise" and "false promises" into dazzling bright images of idealized bodies and untouched nature.

In later years, Bisky's large-size paintings, often depicting adolescents, increasingly shifted towards darker themes. Personal loss, the experience of terror, travels to Brazil and media reports inspired him to examine subjects such as violence, sexuality and destruction symbolized by figures, in many cases floating, falling or tumbling without any gravitational axis. Firmly established in the public conscience through media images following the September 11 attacks, these falling figures explore the transience of youth, the loss of autonomy, isolation and the disintegration of modern civilization.

The aesthetic tumult surrounding the figures is punctuated by the cross pollination of cues from Christian ideology, art history, gay culture, pornography and apocalyptic visions. Through this, Bisky transmits an impression of instability on the canvas that distinctly resonates with our contemporary state of affairs.

In May 2013, Norbert Bisky created his first stage set for the piece "Masse" by the Berlin State Ballet that premiered in the legendary Berlin Nightclub Berghain in May 2013 and was the subject of a TV documentary by German director Nicole Graf.

Since May 2017 Norbert Bisky's large-format painting "Vertigo" is prominently displayed in Berghain's entrance hall as part of the club's art concept, which also features works by Wolfgang Tillmans and Joseph Marr.

For World Press Freedom Day, Norbert Bisky created the painting "Rauschen" which was printed on the title page of numerous German daily newspapers, in collaboration with the Federal association of German newspaper publishers (BDZV: Bundesverband Deutscher Zeitungsverleger) on 3 May 2019.

Bisky is being represented by König Galerie in Berlin. and by Fabienne Levy Gallery in Lausanne, Switzerland.

Exhibitions 
2022
 "Walküren-Basislager", Staatsoper Stuttgart, Stuttgart, Germany
 "Mirror Society", SCAD Museum of Art, Savannah, USA
2021
 „DISINFOTAINMENT", G2 Kunsthalle, Leipzig, Germany
2020
 "Unrest", Fabienne Levy Gallery, Lausanne, Switzerland
 "Metrocake", KONIG TOKIO, Tokio, Japan 
 "Berlin Sunday", Le Confort Moderne, Poitiers, France 
 "Desmadre Berlin", Galerie Daniel Templon, Paris France 
2019
 "RANT", Villa Schöningen, Potsdam, Germany / "POMPA", St. Matthäus-Kirche, Berlin, Germany
 "Tainted Love/Club Edit", Villa Arson, Nizza, France
2018
 "Fernwärme", Museum Langmatt, Baden, Switzerland
 "Hope and Hazard: A Comedy of Eros", curated by Eric Fischl, Hall Art Foundation, Reading, USA
 "Boezemvriend" (with Grit Hachmeister), Cokkie Snoei Gallery, Rotterdam, Netherlands
2017
 "Trilemma", König Galerie, Berlin, Germany
 "Die Revolution ist tot. Lang lebe die Revolution!", Kunstmuseum Bern, Bern, Switzerland
 "MISSING: Der Turm der blauen Pferde by Franz Marc – Contemporary artists in search of a lost masterpiece", Haus am Waldsee, Berlin, Germany
2016
 "Dies Irae", Crone Wien, Vienna, Austria
 "A FUGA", Galeria Baró, São Paulo, Brazil
 "Elective Affinities – German Art Since The Late 1960s", Latvian National Museum of Art, Riga, Latvia
 "Zeitgeist – Arte da Nova Berlim", Centro Cultural Banco do Brasil, Rio de Janeiro, Brazil
2015
 "Hérésie", Galerie Daniel Templon, Brussels, Belgium
 "Levinsky Street", Givon Art Gallery, Tel Aviv, Israel
 "Balagan", Bötzow Berlin, Berlin, Germany
 "Black Bandits", Haus am Lützowplatz, Berlin, Germany
2014
 "Zentrifuge", Kunsthalle Rostock, Rostock, Germany
 "Works on Paper", Galerie Daniel Templon, Paris, France
 "Riots", Galería Espacio Mínimo, Madrid, Spain
 "10", Berghain, Berlin, Germany
 "Utopie Picturale 2", Fonderie Kugler, Geneva, Switzerland
2013
 "Norbert Bisky: Special Report", MEWO Kunsthalle, Memmingen, Germany
 "Paraisópolis", Galerie Crone, Berlin, Germany
2012
 "Stampede", Leo Koenig Inc., New York, USA
 "I am a Berliner", Tel Aviv Museum of Art, Tel Aviv, Israel
 "Laboratories of the Senses", MARTa Herford, Herford, Germany
2011
 "A Retrospective. Ten Years Of Painting", Kunsthalle Marcel Duchamp, Cully, Switzerland
 "Decompression", Galerie Daniel Templon, Paris, France
2010
 "befall", Galerie Crone, Berlin, Germany
 "Maudit", Galerie Charlotte Moser, Geneva, Switzerland
2009
 "Mandelkern", Kunstverein Dortmund, Dortmund, Germany
 "crossing jordaan", Cokkie Snoei, Rotterdam und Amsterdam, Netherlands
 "Nefasto Máximo", Galería Espacio Mínimo, Madrid, Spain
 "Norbert Bisky: Paintings", Haifa Museum of Art, Haifa, Israel
2008
 "cloud cuckoo land", Gallery Mirchandani + Steinruecke, Mumbai, India
 "privat", Galerie Crone, Berlin, Germany
 "minimental", Cokkie Snoei Gallery, Rotterdam
2007
 "Ich war's nicht", Haus am Waldsee, Berlin, Germany
 "What's wrong with me", Leo Koenig Inc., New York, USA
 "Behind Innocence", Gallery Hyundai, Seoul, South Korea
2006
 "Total Care", Contemporary Art Center, Vilnius, Lithuania
 "es tut mir so leid", Galerie Michael Schultz, Berlin, Germany
2005
 "Norbert Bisky", Studio d'Arte Cannaviello, Milan, Italy
 "Déluge", Galerie Suzanne Tarasiève, Paris, France
 "Malerei", Künstlerhaus Bethanien, Berlin, Germany
2004
 "The Proud, the Few", Leo Koenig Inc., New York, USA
 "Abgesagt", Mannheimer Kunstverein, Mannheim, Germany
 "Opkomst en Verval", Cokkie Snoei Gallery, Rotterdam, Netherlands
2003
 "Schlachteplatte", Galerie Michael Schultz, Berlin, Germany
2002
 "Norbert Bisky", Museum Junge Kunst, Frankfurt/Oder, Germany
2001
 "Wir werden siegen", Galerie Michael Schultz, Berlin, Germany
 "Almauftrieb", Kulturbrauerei Prenzlauer Berg, Berlin, Germany
 "Vorkämpfer", Chelsea Kunstraum, Cologne, Germany

Public collections 
 MoMA
 Museum der bildenden Künste, Leipzig, Germany
 Museum Ludwig, Cologne, Germany
 National Museum of Contemporary Art, Gwacheon, South Korea
 Fonds National d'Art Contemporain, Paris, France
 Kunsthalle Rostock
 The MER Collection, Segovia, Spain
 Museum Junge Kunst, Frankfurt/Oder, Germany
 Burger Collection, Hong Kong
 Ellipse Foundation, Portugal
 Deutsche Bank Collection, Frankfurt, Germany
 Hall Art Foundation
 Palm Springs Art Museum
 G2 Kunsthalle, Leipzig, Germany
 Israel Museum, Jerusalem
 Berlinische Galerie, Berlin, Germany

See also
 List of German painters

Notes

Sources
Mullins, Charlotte (2006). Painting People: Figure Painting Today. New York: Distributed Art Publishers.

External links
Official website
Interview with Norbert Bisky in Exberliner Magazine
Leo Koenig Inc.: Norbert Bisky
Haifa Museum of Art
Artnet.com profile

1970 births
Living people
Artists from Leipzig
20th-century German painters
20th-century German male artists
German male painters
21st-century German painters
21st-century German male artists
German LGBT painters
German gay artists
Gay painters
German contemporary artists